Faster & Llouder is the second studio album by American country music duo Foster & Lloyd. It contained their last Top 10 song, "Fair Shake". The other singles released, "Before the Heartache Rolls In" and "Suzette" failed to break into the top 40. The album itself peaked at No. 44 on the Billboard Top Country Albums chart. It was, however, their only album to appear on the Billboard 200, charting at No. 142.

Content
The duo co-wrote most of the songs on the album, with Guy Clark co-writing for the successful single "Fair Shake" and Pat Terry co-writing the last track with Bill Lloyd. The track "Before The Heartache Rolls In" was covered by Hootie & the Blowfish in 1997 and included as a B-side to the band's single, "Old Man & Me". Vince Gill contributes his guitar playing skills on the opening track "Faster and Louder".

Reception

Rudyard Kennedy of AllMusic called the album a "superior example of new country..before the term 'New Country' was invented" and calling the material on the album "Just as good, if not better, than that of the songs on the first album.

Track listing
Songs written by Bill Lloyd and Radney Foster unless otherwise noted
"Faster and Louder" - 2:33
"Fair Shake" (Guy Clark, Foster, Lloyd) - 3:26
"She Knows What She Wants" - 3:39
"Happy for Awhile" – 4:08
"Fat Lady Sings" - 4:34
"After I'm Gone" - 3:10
"I'll Always Be Here Loving You" (Foster) – 2:56
"Suzette" (Lloyd) - 2:42
"Before The Heartache Rolls In" - 3:49
"Lie to Yourself" (Lloyd, Pat Terry) – 4:41

Chart performance

Album

Singles

Personnel
As listed in liner notes.

Foster & Lloyd
Radney Foster - lead vocals, background vocals
Bill Lloyd - lead vocals, harmony vocals, electric guitar, acoustic guitar, mandolin, piano, tambourine

Musicians
Bruce Bouton - pedal steel guitar, lap steel guitar
Sam Bush - fiddle on "Happy for a While"
John Cowan - third part harmony vocals on "She Knows What She Wants" and "After I'm Gone"
Marshall Crenshaw - electric rhythm guitar, solo guitars, 6 string bass on "She Knows What She Wants"
Beth Nielsen Chapman - background vocals on "Before The Next Heartache Rolls In"
Jerry Douglas - dobro on "Happy For a While"
Vince Gill - electric guitar on "Faster and Louder"
Mike McAdam - 6 string bass
Tommy Wells - drums
Glenn Worf - bass guitar

Sources

1989 albums
Foster & Lloyd albums
RCA Records albums